Velvet is a type of woven tufted fabric in which the cut threads are evenly distributed, with a short  pile, giving it a distinctive soft feel. By extension, the word velvety means "smooth like velvet". In the past, velvet was typically made from silk. Today, velvet can be made from linen, cotton, wool and synthetic fibers.

Construction and composition 

Velvet is woven on a special loom that weaves two thicknesses of the material at the same time. The two pieces are then cut apart to create the pile effect, and the two lengths of fabric are wound on separate take-up rolls. This complicated process meant that velvet was expensive to make before industrial power looms became available, and well-made velvet remains a fairly costly fabric. Velvet is difficult to clean because of its pile, but modern dry cleaning methods make cleaning more feasible. Velvet pile is created by warp or vertical yarns and velveteen pile is created by weft or fill yarns.

Velvet can be made from several different kinds of fibers, traditionally, the most expensive of which is silk. Much of the velvet sold today as "silk velvet" is actually a mix of rayon and silk. Velvet made entirely from silk is rare and usually has market prices of several hundred US dollars per yard. Cotton is also used to make velvet, though this often results in a less luxurious fabric. Velvet can also be made from fibers such as linen, mohair, and wool. A cloth made by the Kuba people of the Democratic Republic of Congo from the raffia palm is often referred to as "Kuba velvet". More recently, synthetic velvets have been developed, mostly from polyester, nylon, viscose, acetate, and from either mixtures of different synthetics or from combined synthetics and natural fibers (for example viscose mixed with silk produces a very soft, reflective fabric). A small percentage of spandex is sometimes added to give the final material a certain amount of stretch (hence "stretch velvet").

History 

Because of its unusual softness and appearance as well as its high cost of production, velvet has often been associated with nobility. Velvet was introduced to Baghdad during the rule of Harun al-Rashid (786–809) by Kashmiri merchants and to Al-Andalus by Ziryab. In the Mamluk era, Cairo was the world's largest producer of velvet. Much of it was exported to Venice (whence it spread to most of Europe), Iberia and the Mali Empire. Mansa Musa, the ruler of the Mali Empire, visited Cairo on his pilgrimage to Mecca. Many Arab velvet makers accompanied him back to Timbuktu. Later Ibn Battuta mentions how Suleyman, the ruler of Mali, wore a locally produced complete crimson velvet kaftan on Eid. During the reign of Mehmed II, assistant cooks wore blue dresses, conical hats and baggy trousers made from Bursa velvet.

King Richard II of England directed in his will that his body should be clothed  in 1399.

The Encyclopædia Britannica Eleventh Edition described velvet and its history thus:

Types 

 Chiffon (or transparent) velvet: very lightweight velvet on a sheer silk or rayon chiffon base.
 Ciselé: velvet where the pile uses cut and uncut loops to create a pattern.
 Crushed: lustrous velvet with patterned appearance that is produced by either pressing the fabric down in different directions, or alternatively by mechanically twisting the fabric while wet.
 Devoré or burnout: a velvet treated with a caustic solution to dissolve areas of the pile, creating a velvet pattern upon a sheer or lightweight base fabric.
 Embossed: velvet on which a metal roller has been used to heat-stamp the fabric, producing a pattern.
 Hammered: an extremely lustrous velvet with a crushed and dappled appearance.
 Lyons: a densely woven, stiff, heavier-weight pile velvet used for hats, coat collars and garments.
 Mirror: a type of exceptionally soft and light crushed velvet.
Nacré: velvet with an effect similar to shot silk where the pile is woven in one or more colours and the base fabric in another, creating a changeable, iridescent effect.
 Panne: a type of crushed velvet produced by forcing the pile in a single direction by applying heavy pressure. Sometimes, less frequently, called paon velvet. However, since the 1970s, "panne velvet" as used in ordinary fabric stores has referred to a pile knit, perhaps better called a velour, with a short pile that falls in many directions; usually of polyester.
 Pile-on-pile, also called double velvet: a particularly luxurious type of velvet woven with piles of differing heights to create a pattern. It is one of the oldest known velvet weaving techniques.
 Plain: velvet commonly made of cotton with a firm hand.
Ponson: A very heavy and quite expensive velvet made either entirely with silk or having a pile exclusively of silk, used at one point for women's dresses and cloaks
Utrecht: a pressed and crimped velvet associated with Utrecht, the Netherlands.
 Velveteen: a type of imitation velvet. It is normally made of cotton or a combination of cotton and silk. It has a pile that is short (never more than 3mm deep), and is closely set. It has a firm hand and a slightly sloping pile. Unlike true velvet, this type has greater body, does not drape as easily, and has less sheen.
 Voided: velvet deliberately woven with areas of pile-free ground (usually satin) forming a pattern.
Wedding ring or ring velvet: another term for devoré and/or chiffon velvets which are allegedly fine enough to be drawn through a wedding ring.

Fibers 

 Cotton – Cotton velvet is highly durable, but lacks much of the luxuriousness of other varieties of velvet, and its colors tend not to be as deep or rich
 Silk – Silk velvet is one of the more expensive kinds of velvet, and is usually shinier and softer than the cotton variety
 Microfiber – Microfiber velvet is a synthetic polyester variety of the fabric that resists stains easily and is lightweight
 Nylon/rayon blend – Nylon/rayon blend velvet has much of the feel and drape of silk-based velvet, but is usually much less expensive; also, it is easier to care for than silk velvet
 Polyester/spandex – Polyester/spandex velvet (often called "stretch velvet") can be made of polyester with a small percentage of spandex to allow it to stretch in one or two directions
 Viscose – In terms of quality, viscose velvet is more similar to silk velvet than cotton velvet

Gallery

See also 

 Corduroy
 Flocking (texture)
 Velour
 Velvet painting
 Terrycloth

References

External links 

 

Pile fabrics